Personnage Gothique, Oiseau-Eclair is a bronze sculpture by Joan Miró.

It was created in 1974, and cast in 1977. It is in the National Gallery of Art Sculpture Garden, Washington, USA.

See also
 List of public art in Washington, D.C., Ward 2

References

External links
"National Gallery of Art Sculpture Garden: Page Three", Bluffton

1974 sculptures
Collections of the National Gallery of Art
Art in Washington, D.C.
Bronze sculptures in Washington, D.C.
National Gallery of Art Sculpture Garden